The SBS Open at Turtle Bay was a golf tournament for professional female golfers, played on the LPGA Tour that took place between 2005 and 2009 on the Palmer Course at Turtle Bay Resort in Oahu, Hawaii, USA.

The tournament title sponsor was SBS, formerly the Seoul Broadcasting System, one of four major national South Korean television and radio networks.

SBS discontinued its sponsorship after the 2009 tournament and the LPGA failed to secure another sponsor.

Winners

Tournament record

External links
Tournament results at golfobserver.com
LPGA official 2009 tournament microsite

Former LPGA Tour events
Golf in Hawaii
Seoul Broadcasting System
Recurring sporting events established in 2005
Recurring sporting events disestablished in 2009
2005 establishments in Hawaii
2009 disestablishments in Hawaii
History of women in Hawaii